Gekko albomaculatus, commonly known as Smith's gecko or large forest gecko, is a species of gecko. It is found in Thailand and Malaysia.

References

Gekko
Reptiles described in 1861
Geckos of Thailand
Geckos of Malaysia